Arthur Cornforth (February 21, 1861 – August 5, 1938) was the 13th Lieutenant Governor of Colorado, serving from January to March 1905 under Alva Adams, then March to July 1905 under Jesse F. McDonald.

Cornforth was born in Smethport, McKean County, Pennsylvania.  He was a member of the Colorado State Senate from 1903 to 1905 and again from 1911 to 1915.

Cornforth ran for mayor of Colorado Springs in 1913.  Cornforth was a Colorado district judge from 1921 to 1938.

Sources

1861 births
1938 deaths
People from Smethport, Pennsylvania
Colorado state senators
Lieutenant Governors of Colorado